Ezetimibe/rosuvastatin, sold under the brand name Ridutrin among others, is a combination medication used to treat high cholesterol. In some countries it is sold as a kit or a pack containing two distinct pills. It is also available in the form of a composite package containing the two separate pills.

The combination was approved for medical use in the United States in March 2021.

Medical uses 
Ezetimibe/rosuvastatin is indicated as an adjunct to diet in people with primary non-familial hyperlipidemia to reduce low-density lipoprotein cholesterol (LDL-C); and alone or as an adjunct to other LDL-C-lowering therapies in people with homozygous familial hypercholesterolemia (HoFH) to reduce LDL-C.

References

External links 
 

Combination drugs
Hypolipidemic agents